This is a list of football games played by the Thailand national under-23 football team

1991

1995

1999

2001

2002

2003

2005

2006

2007

2009

2010

2011

2012

2013

2014

2015

2016

2017

2018

2019

2020

2021

2022

Notes

External links
 Football Association of Thailand 
 Thai Football.com
 Thai football page of Fifa.com
 Thai football Blog

U-23